Leratswana is a small township in the Free State province of South Africa, adjacent to Arlington. Arlington was established as an important railway link between Lindley and Senekal.

Geography and Layout
Leratswana (like all Free State towns) features a racial segregated geography due to the policies of Apartheid. This can be seen by the fact that the white population live in the town of Arlington, while the non-white (almost exclusively black) community lives in the neighboring township of Leratswana, which is currently being greatly extended. Leratswana has by far a greater population than Arlington, and therefore if the two were part of a single town, it would have a black majority.

Although very few non-whites have moved into the actual town of 'Arlington', this remains minimal.

Road
Leratswana lies on the R707, which separates Arlington from Leratswana. This road connects the towns of Lindley and Senekal.

See also
 Arlington

References

Populated places in the Nketoana Local Municipality
Townships in the Free State (South African province)